Tokoin is a neighborhood of Lomé, Togo. It contains the Tokoin Teaching Hospital, and Lomé–Tokoin Airport.

References

Neighborhoods of Lomé